Dale Furutani (born December 1, 1946, in Hilo, Hawaii) is the first Asian American to win major mystery writing awards. He has won the Anthony Award and the Macavity Award and has been nominated for the Agatha Award. His book, The Toyotomi Blades, was selected as the best mystery of 1997 by the Internet Critics Group. He has been called "the best known of Japanese American writers". 

Furutani's family came from Yamaguchi Prefecture in Japan to Hawaii in 1896. He was raised in San Pedro, California, where he attended school. He has a degree in Creative Writing from California State University, Long Beach, and an MBA in Marketing from UCLA. In addition to his writing career, he has held positions as Parts Marketing Manager for Yamaha Motorcycles, Director of Information Systems for Nissan USA, and CIO of Edmunds.com. 

He has written mysteries set in modern Los Angeles and Tokyo as well as a mystery trilogy set in 1603 Japan. He has received a starred review from Publishers Weekly and have been on the Mystery Writers of America national bestseller list, the Los Angeles Times Bestseller List for all fiction, and numerous local mystery bestseller lists. He has been invited to speak at the U. S. Library of Congress several times as both a mystery writer and an Asian American writer. He has also been invited to speak at numerous writer's and mystery conventions.

Personal life
Furutani lives near Seattle, Washington, but spends considerable time in Japan. He has lived in Japan for up to three years at a time.

Books
 Death in Little Tokyo, 1996. 
 Toyotomi Blades, 1997. 
 Death at the Crossroads, 1998. 
 Jade Palace Vendetta, 1999. 
 Kill the Shogun, 2000. 
 The Curious Adventures of Sherlock Holmes in Japan, 2011.

References

External links
 Furutani's website

1946 births
20th-century American novelists
21st-century American novelists
American male novelists
American mystery writers
American novelists of Asian descent
American writers of Japanese descent
Anthony Award winners
Living people
Macavity Award winners
People from Hilo, Hawaii
UCLA Anderson School of Management alumni
Novelists from Hawaii
20th-century American male writers
21st-century American male writers